The Great War of 1892 was a story of the genre termed "Invasion Literature" written by Admiral Philip Howard Colomb, intended to warn Britain about what he saw as the weakness of the Royal Navy. It was published in Black and White, a weekly magazine which focused on the exploits of Britain's Army and Navy. It was a collaboration between Colomb and several experienced journalists and had been prompted by the success of The Battle of Dorking.  Its success led in turn to the commissioning of George Griffith's futuristic fantasy The Angel of the Revolution.

Novels set in fictional wars
British war novels
19th-century British novels